Thống Nhất Stadium is a multi-purpose stadium in Ho Chi Minh City, Vietnam. It is located at 138 Đào Duy Từ Street, Ward 6, District 10. It is currently used mostly for football matches and is the home stadium for both Sài Gòn and Thành phố Hồ Chí Minh of the V.League 1. The stadium has a capacity of 15,000.

History

Early years 
In 1929, Chợ Lớn Municipal Commission decided to build a new stadium in the city. The stadium was named Renault Field after the city commission's chairman at the time - Philippe Oreste Renault. The stadium was opened on October 18, 1931 by an inauguration football match between Cho Lon Police and Gia Dinh Stars with the Cho Lon side taking a 1-0 win. In its early day, the stadium only consisted of one 20-step spectators' stand, which was covered by a reinforced cement roof.

1955 – 1975 
From 1959 to October 1960, new stands and a lighting system were added to the stadium while the main stand was expanded. This expansion increased the capacity of the stadium to 30,000 people. The stadium was then also renamed to Cộng Hòa Stadium ("Republic Stadium"). It was renovated again in 1967.

Between 1955 and 1975, the site had witnessed a number of major sporting events including an over-capacity 30,000 strong crowd to watch the elimination football match between South Vietnam and South Korea leading up to the 1964 Summer Olympics. The Merdeka Cup gold trophy, won by South Vietnam in 1966, was kept at the stadium. Its whereabouts are not known after the Fall of Saigon.

During the Vietnam War, the stadium was also the scene of terrorist attacks by the Vietcong. Explosives detonated on October 4, 1965 killed 11 and injured 42 others.

Post-1975 
On September 2, 1975, the stadium was renamed Thống Nhất Stadium ("Reunification Stadium") after a football match between Hải Quan F.C. and Ngân Hàng F.C. took place.

The stadium has been home to Hồ Chí Minh City F.C. (formerly known as Saigon Port F.C.) since the club's formation in 1975. Between 1995 and 2002, it was also the home ground to Hồ Chí Minh City Police F.C.

In 2002, renovation was done to prepare the stadium to host Group B men's football matches at the 2003 Southeast Asian Games. It was usually home to Vietnam national football team alongside Hàng Đẫy Stadium in Hanoi until 2003 when Mỹ Đình National Stadium was completed.

In 2016, Sài Gòn F.C. selected Thong Nhat as the home stadium for their first season in V.League 1.

Until 2017, the stadium has a capacity of 19,450 people. Since then, the stadium has been renovated in phases. In the first phase, the A1 and A2 sections of the main stand were repainted and a new 1500-lux floodlight system was installed in the last quarter of 2017. In 2018, the playing field was redone and more than 6,700 seats were added to the B, C and D stands. This reduced the capacity of the stadium to approximately 15,000 people. In 2019, existing seats in stand A will be replaced while new seats will be added to the east and west wings of the stand (A4 and A5).

Usage 
The stadium has hosted various domestic and international sporting and entertainment events throughout its history. Some of the most notable sporting events are listed below

 1964 AFC Youth Championship
 1998 AFF Championship
 2003 Southeast Asian Games (men's football)
 2008 AFC Women's Asian Cup
 2010 AFF U-19 Youth Championship
 2011 AFC U-19 Women's Championship
 2012 AFF U-19 Youth Championship
 2012 AFF Women's Championship
 2014 AFC Women's Asian Cup 
 2015 AFF Women's Championship
 2016 Asian Junior Athletics Championships

External links
StadiumDB images

References

Football venues in Vietnam
Sports venues in Ho Chi Minh City
Multi-purpose stadiums in Vietnam